Lancet most commonly refers to The Lancet, a medical journal.

It may also refer to:

Medicine
Lancet (surgery), a cutting instrument with a double-edged blade and a pointed end for making small incisions or drainage punctures.
Blood lancet, a pricking needle used to obtain drops of blood for testing

Architecture
Lancet arch, a narrow, tall opening with a pointed arch
Lancet window, a window set in a lancet arch

People
Doron Lancet, Israeli geneticist

Other uses
Dennis Lancet, a bus chassis
LG Lancet, a Windows smartphone
ZALA Lancet, a Russian military drone

See also
Lancelet, an animal
Lance (disambiguation)